Juli Sanclimens i Genescà (29 August 1935 – 12 June 2020) was a Spanish Catalan politician and member of the now defunct Democratic Convergence of Catalonia. He served as the Mayor of Manresa from 1987 until 1995 and a member of the Parliament of Catalonia from 1984 to 1995.

Sanclimens was born in Manresa on 29 August 1935. He graduated from the IESE Business School in 1958. Sanclimens  joined the Democratic Convergence of Catalonia in 1976 and served on the party's National Executive Committee between 1987 and 1995.

Juli Sanclimens i Genescà died in a Manresa hospital on 12 June 2020, at the age of 84. He was survived by three children - Xavier, David and Marc.

References

1935 births
2020 deaths
Members of the Parliament of Catalonia
Mayors of places in Catalonia
Democratic Convergence of Catalonia politicians